This article provides details of international football games played by the Indonesia women's national football team from 2020 to present.

2020–present

2021

2022

2023

Forthcoming fixtures
The following matches are scheduled:

2023

References

2020s in Indonesian sport
Indonesia women's national football team results